Robert Jesse Pulford (born March 31, 1936) is a Canadian former professional ice hockey forward who played for the Toronto Maple Leafs and Los Angeles Kings in the National Hockey League.  He later served as head coach of the Kings before spending 30 years with the Chicago Blackhawks as a coach and general manager.

Early life
Pulford and his family lived on King St. in Weston, Ontario from 1940 to 1950, and he attended Memorial School prior to the family move to rural Ontario.

Pulford played junior hockey in Weston, then senior hockey for the Marlboros.

Playing career
Pulford played junior hockey for the Toronto Marlboros for three seasons from 1953 to 1956, winning two Memorial Cups under coach Turk Broda. He moved up to the Maple Leafs for the 1956–57 season and remained with the team for 14 seasons wearing jersey number 20. Pulford was an important member of the Leaf teams that won four Stanley Cups in 1962–1964 and 1967.

With the series tied 1–1, Pulford scored the overtime game winner in game 3 of the 1967 Stanley Cup Finals against the Montreal Canadiens. The Montreal goalie was Rogie Vachon. Pulford later coached Vachon in Los Angeles as the Kings rose to prominence in the mid-1970s.

The Leafs traded him to the Los Angeles Kings on September 3, 1970, where he played two seasons and retired as a player in 1972.

In 1967 Pulford was elected the first president of the National Hockey League Players' Association.

Coaching career

Immediately after retiring as a player, Pulford became head coach of the Kings for the 1972–73 season and led the team for five years before becoming coach and general manager of the Chicago Blackhawks in 1977. As coach of the Kings, he helped Los Angeles go from being one of the worst defensive and penalty killing teams in the NHL to one of the best. He guided the Kings to their first playoff appearance in five years in 1974, and won the Jack Adams Award as coach of the year in the NHL in 1975. That season, the Kings amassed 105 points, still a club record through 2013. He also led the Kings to their first playoff series wins since 1969 when they defeated the Atlanta Flames in the first round of both the 1976 and 1977 NHL playoffs.  Pulford left the Kings after the 1976–77 season after constant feuding with then owner Jack Kent Cooke. Pulford wanted to become General Manager as well as coach, or at least have a bigger role in player personnel decisions. Cooke however, often meddled in player personnel matters, and in the mid-1970s, reverted to his old habits of trading promising young players and draft picks for veteran, past their prime former stars.

He served as coach for the Blackhawks on three separate occasions from 1977 to 1987. He was promoted to senior vice president in 1990, but took on the general manager's duties again from 1992 to 1997, from 1999 to 2000, and from 2003 to 2005. During his third stint as general manager, Pulford nominally doubled as head coach, demoting Lorne Molleken to an assistant. However, Molleken remained the team's main operator on the bench, with Pulford as more or less a senior consultant.

In seven seasons and 426 games as Hawks coach over three stints, Pulford won 182, lost 176, and tied 68. At the time he left the bench for good, only Billy Reay had won more regular season games for the Hawks. Pulford is now third, behind Reay and Joel Quenneville for most regular season games won as Hawk coach.

He won the Jack Adams Award for best coach in the NHL in 1975. Pulford was also honoured to be named head coach of Team USA during the 1976 Canada Cup tournament.

He was inducted into the Hockey Hall of Fame in 1991.

On October 11, 2007, Pulford was named an officer with the Wirtz Corporation, parent company of the Blackhawks, and is no longer part of the day-to-day management of the Blackhawks.

His son-in-law is Dean Lombardi, a former assistant general manager for the Minnesota North Stars, GM of the San Jose Sharks, and president and general manager of the Los Angeles Kings. He is currently a senior advisor in the Philadelphia Flyers organization.

In 2012, Pulford was honoured by the Kings in a pregame ceremony; the team wore their purple and gold 1970s throwback uniforms in the game following this ceremony.

Career statistics 

* Stanley Cup Champion.

Coaching record

See also
List of NHL players with 1000 games played

External links
 

1936 births
Chicago Blackhawks coaches
Chicago Blackhawks executives
Hockey Hall of Fame inductees
Ice hockey people from Ontario
Jack Adams Award winners
Lester Patrick Trophy recipients
Living people
Los Angeles Kings coaches
Los Angeles Kings players
Sportspeople from Simcoe County
Stanley Cup champions
Toronto Maple Leafs players
Toronto Marlboros players
Canadian ice hockey left wingers
Canadian ice hockey coaches